Canadian singer-songwriter Mac DeMarco has released six studio albums, two live albums, three compilation albums, five extended plays (EPs), three singles, and 17 music videos. DeMarco was in several bands in high school until he graduated in 2008. In 2009, he released his debut EP, Heat Wave, under the name Makeout Videotape. The EP sold out its 500-unit run. DeMarco was joined by Alex Calder and Jen Clement, and Makeout Videotape was signed to Unfamiliar Records. Heat Wave was followed by two EPs, Eating Like a Kid and Bossa Yeye, and one studio album, Ying Yang, all in 2010.

In 2012, DeMarco went back to recording as a solo artist and was signed by Captured Tracks. They released his EP Rock and Roll Night Club in early 2012; it received positive reviews from contemporary music critics. His second studio album, 2, followed later the same year. 2 was met with critical acclaim and peaked at number 26 on the Billboard Heatseekers chart. It was followed by DeMarco’s third studio album, Salad Days in 2014. Salad Days was also praised by critics and peaked at number 90 on the UK Albums Chart, and number 30 on the Billboard 200. DeMarco released an EP titled Some Other Ones and the mini-LP Another One in the summer of 2015. Another One was met with positive reviews and peaked at number 24 on the UK Albums Chart. In the United States, it peaked at number 25 on the Billboard 200, selling 13,000 copies in its first week. This Old Dog, DeMarco's fourth album, was released in the summer of 2017 to critical acclaim.

Albums

Studio albums

Live albums

Mini-LPs

Compilation albums

EPs

Singles

Singles

Promotional singles

Other charted and certified songs

Music videos

Explanatory notes 
Released as Makeout Videotape

References

External links 
 Record company profile
 

Discographies of Canadian artists
Rock music discographies